The Interim Uttarakhand Legislative Assembly also known as Antarim Uttarakhand Vidhan Sabha was a unicameral governing and law making body of the newly formed Indian state of Uttarakhand (then Uttaranchal). As a Provisional Legislative Assembly it came into existence with the formation of the State of Uttarakhand at 9 November 2000 which was later succeeded by the Uttarakhand Legislative Assembly with the first assembly election that took place on February 14th, 2002. It was at that time consisted with total 30 Members including 22 Members of the Legislative Assembly and 8 Members of the Legislative Council from the Legislative Assembly and Legislative Council of Uttar Pradesh, off which then Uttarakhand was formed out.

Party position in the Assembly

Key post holders in the Assembly
 Speaker :  Prakash Pant
 Deputy Speaker : Vacant
 Leader of the House: Nityanand Swami (2000–2001)Bhagat Singh Koshyari (2001–2002)
 Leader of the Opposition : Vacant
 Chief Secretary :

List of the Interim Assembly members

See also
Uttarakhand Legislative Assembly
2002 Uttarakhand Legislative Assembly election
Swami ministry
Koshyari ministry
Politics of Uttarakhand

References

Government of Uttarakhand
Uttarakhand Legislative Assembly
History of Uttarakhand (1947–present)
2000 establishments in Uttarakhand
2002 disestablishments in India